Peritaxia hispida is a species of broad-nosed weevil in the beetle family Curculionidae. It is found in North America. 

The species was first described in 1876 by George H. Horn in Leconte's The Rhynchoptera  of America, North of Mexico.

References

Further reading

 
 

Entiminae
Articles created by Qbugbot
Beetles described in 1876